The natal house of the Pope Alexander VI is located in Xàtiva (Valencia, Spain). It is a small urban house, where the Pope Alexander VI was born and lived in the Kingdom of Valencia, Spain. According to the tradition, at the number 5 of the old square of Aldomar, currently Alexander VI Square, was the birthplace of Rodrigo de Borja. From the original house where Alexander VI was born is preserved the door façade.

See also 
 Route of the Borgias

References

External links
 

Pope Alexander VI
Buildings and structures in the Valencian Community
Route of the Borgias
Alexander VI, Pope
Xàtiva